"[Citation needed]" is a tag added by Wikipedia editors to unsourced statements in articles requesting citations to be added. The phrase is reflective of the policies of verifiability and no original research on Wikipedia and has become a general Internet meme.

Usage on Wikipedia
The tag was first used on Wikipedia in 2006. By Wikipedia policy, editors should add citations for content, to ensure accuracy and neutrality, and to avoid original research. The on needed tag is used to mark statements that lack such citations. , there were more than 350,000 pages on Wikipedia containing at least one instance of the tag. Users who click the tag will be directed to pages about Wikipedia's verifiability policy and its application using the tag.

Usage outside Wikipedia

In 2008, Matt Mechtley created stickers with "[on needed]", encouraging people to stick them on advertisements.

In 2010, American television hosts Jon Stewart and Stephen Colbert led the Rally to Restore Sanity and/or Fear at the National Mall in Washington, D.C., where some participants held placards with "[on needed]".

Randall Munroe has frequently used "[on needed]" tags for humorous commentary in his writings, including in his 2014 book What If?

References

External links
 
Citation needed at Know Your Meme

2005 introductions
Internet memes introduced in the 2000s
Wikipedia